Aphirape is a genus of South American jumping spiders that was first described by Carl Ludwig Koch in 1850.

Species
 it contains eight species, found in Uruguay, Argentina, Bolivia, and Brazil:
Aphirape ancilla (C. L. Koch, 1846) (type) – Brazil
Aphirape boliviensis Galiano, 1981 – Bolivia, Argentina
Aphirape flexa Galiano, 1981 – Argentina, Uruguay
Aphirape gamas Galiano, 1996 – Brazil, Argentina
Aphirape misionensis Galiano, 1981 – Argentina, Brazil
Aphirape riojana (Mello-Leitão, 1941) – Argentina
Aphirape riparia Galiano, 1981 – Argentina
Aphirape uncifera (Tullgren, 1905) – Argentina

References

Salticidae genera
Salticidae
Spiders of South America
Taxa named by Carl Ludwig Koch